Too is the seventh 
album by the band Kingdom Come. It contains eight new tracks and three re-recordings of previously released Stone Fury songs.

Track listing

Band members 

Lenny Wolf – vocals & rhythm guitar
Oliver Kiessner – rhythm & lead guitar
Mirko Michalzik – solo guitar
Mark Smith – bass
Mark Cross – drums
Bjorn Tiemann – keyboards

References

External links
 Lenny Wolf homepage

2000 albums
Kingdom Come (band) albums
Eagle Records albums